Marty Mornhinweg (born March 29, 1962) is an American football coach and former player who was a senior offensive consultant for the Philadelphia Eagles of the National Football League (NFL). He was the offensive coordinator for the San Francisco 49ers from 1997 to 2000, head coach of the Detroit Lions from 2001 to 2002, offensive coordinator for the Eagles from 2006 to 2012, offensive coordinator for the New York Jets from 2013 to 2014, and offensive coordinator for the Baltimore Ravens from 2016 to 2018.

Playing career

Early years
Born in Edmond, Oklahoma, Mornhinweg played high school football in San Jose, California. He led the Oak Grove Eagles to a Central Coast Section championship in 1978 with a  rout of defending champion St. Francis of Mountain View in the title game 

Following the 1978 championship season as a junior, Mornhinweg was the 1979 Northern California Player of Year as a senior, but the Eagles fell 32–29 in the semifinals to Salinas. For his performance during his time at Oak Grove, the school honored Mornhinweg and inducted him into its hall of fame.

College
Mornhinweg was a four-year starter at quarterback for the University of Montana in Missoula, where he set 15 passing records. During his junior season in 1982, Mornhinweg led the Griz to its first Big Sky Conference championship in a 
He sat out the 1983 season due to an academic suspension for an “academic infraction”.

Through Mornhinweg's performance, Montana inducted him into the Montana Hall of Fame. He earned his bachelor's degree in health and physical education/coaching, then went on to earn a master of science in health and physical education/sports administration from the University of Texas at El Paso. Mornhinweg was not selected in the 1985 NFL Draft.

Professional
While a collegiate assistant coach, Mornhinweg became the starting quarterback for the Denver Dynamite in the Arena Football League in 1987. In his first start, he completed 3 of 4 passes for 30 yards and was sacked twice. Soon after, Mornhinweg blew out his knee.  His team, however, went on to win the inaugural Arena Bowl I with a 45–16 victory over the Pittsburgh Gladiators.

Coaching career

College
In 1985, Mornhinweg was the receivers coach at his alma mater, the University of Montana.  Between 1988 and 1994, he coached at several universities, including: Northern Arizona (running backs), SE Missouri State (offense), Missouri (tight ends and the offensive line), and again at Northern Arizona (offense).

Professional
During 1995 and 1996, Mornhinweg coached with the Green Bay Packers, first as an offensive assistant, then as the quarterbacks coach under head coach Mike Holmgren.  From 1997 to 2000, he was offensive coordinator for the San Francisco 49ers, under Steve Mariucci.

In 2001, Mornhinweg became the head coach of the Detroit Lions, taking over a team that saw two head coaches leave in the previous season. He compiled a 5–27 record in two seasons.

His most notable moment as a head coach came in Week 12 during the 2002 Detroit Lions season against the Chicago Bears. After the Lions gave up a 10 point lead in the 4th quarter, the game went into overtime, and the Lions won the ensuing coin toss. However, due to the strong wind at Memorial Stadium that day, Mornhinweg chose to let the Bears have the ball first so that Jason Hanson could kick with the wind rather than against it. The Lions defense managed to force a 4th down with 8 yards to go on the Lions 35 yard line, which would have likely forced the Bears to punt as a 52 yard field goal would have been beyond kicker Paul Edinger's range due to the strong wind gusts. However, the Bears got called for a 10 yard holding penalty which Mornhinweg accepted, allowing the Bears to replay 3rd down with 18 yards to go, rather than declining it to let the Bears still face 4th and 8. Bears quarterback Jim Miller then completed a 15 yard pass to Marty Booker to make it 4th down and 3, which the Bears converted with a 5 yard pass. After using three run plays to get closer to the goalposts, Edinger kicked a 40 yard field goal to win the game. Mornhinweg's decision making was met with astonishment and mockery from the press and ESPN anchor Chris Berman. Mornhinweg was then fired by the Lions at the end of the season. 

In 2003, he joined the coaching staff of the Philadelphia Eagles. Mornhinweg masterminded the Eagles offense in the final six games of the 2006 season, and into the NFC playoffs.  Coach Andy Reid gave Mornhinweg the play-calling responsibilities after the Eagles' disastrous loss to the Indianapolis Colts, 45–21. The Eagles won all six games, employing a more balanced run/pass attack. The wins included a three consecutive December divisional road games, all with a back-up quarterback, Jeff Garcia.  It was the only time Reid yielded play-calling responsibilities, a role Mornhinweg continued through the 2012 season, until Reid (and his staff) was fired at the end of that season. Instead of continuing to coach under Reid in Kansas City, Mornhinweg took an offensive coordinator position with the New York Jets in 2013. During his time with the Jets he was the offensive coordinator under Rex Ryan.

On January 21, 2015, Mornhinweg was hired as quarterbacks coach for the Baltimore Ravens. On October 10, 2016, Mornhinweg was promoted from quarterbacks coach to offensive coordinator after Marc Trestman was fired. Mornhinweg was released by the Ravens after the 2018 season.

During his career as an offensive coordinator, Mornhinweg's offenses have finished 1st, 2nd, 4th, 5th, 9th, 10th, and 12th in total offense, and regularly highly ranked in big plays.

In all, Mornhinweg has coached a year of high school, ten years in the college ranks, and 20 years in the NFL. Throughout his coaching career, Mornhinweg has coached every position on the offensive side of the ball.

Mornhinweg has coached five different quarterbacks who earned Pro Bowl selections: Brett Favre, Steve Young, Jeff Garcia, Donovan McNabb, and Michael Vick.

Mornhinweg was hired by the Eagles as a senior offensive consultant on March 5, 2020. His contract was not renewed after the 2020 season.

NFL head coaching record

Personal life
Mornhinweg and his wife, Lindsay, have four children, two daughters and two sons. Madi is a recent graduate of Penn and Molly attends Montana. Skyler was a quarterback in the Ivy League at Columbia (transferred from Florida), and Cade is in high school.

References

External links
 ArenaFan profile

1962 births
Living people
American football quarterbacks
Baltimore Ravens coaches
Detroit Lions head coaches
Denver Dynamite (arena football) players
Green Bay Packers coaches
Missouri Tigers football coaches
Montana Grizzlies football coaches
Montana Grizzlies football players
National Football League offensive coordinators
New York Jets coaches
Northern Arizona Lumberjacks football coaches
Philadelphia Eagles coaches
Players of American football from San Jose, California
San Francisco 49ers coaches
Southeast Missouri State Redhawks football coaches
Sportspeople from Edmond, Oklahoma
UTEP Miners football coaches